The following page lists operating nuclear power stations. The list is based on figures from PRIS (Power Reactor Information System) maintained by International Atomic Energy Agency.

In service 
This table lists all currently operational power stations. Some of these may have reactors under construction, but only current net capacity is listed. Capacity of permanently shut-down reactors is not included, but capacity of long-term shut-down reactors (today mainly in Japan) is included.

Under construction 

This table lists stations under construction stations without any reactor in service. Planned connection column indicates the connection of the first reactor, not thus whole capacity.

Permanently shut down

This table lists stations that are permanently shut down. Listed on 1985, 2005-2022 ongoing.

Gallery of power plants

See also 
 List of nuclear reactors — shows individual reactors and dates
 List of boiling water reactors 
 List of small modular reactor designs
 Lists of nuclear disasters and radioactive incidents
 Nuclear power by country

Notes

References

External links 
 PRIS (Power Reactor Information System) database maintained by International Atomic Energy Agency
 World Nuclear Power Reactors database maintained by World Nuclear Association

Nuclear
nuclear power stations